Dance Jodi Dance (season 2) or Dance Jodi Dance 2.0 is a 2017-2018 Tamil-language dance competition reality television show, that aired on Zee Tamil from 2 December 2017 to 26 May 2018. It is a second season of the show Dance Jodi Dance. Actress Sneha, Gautami and Priyamani are the judges of this show and hosted by Deepak Dinkar. The season title winner is Ruth and Rinish Raj.

Judges
 Sneha 
 Gautami 
 Priyamani

Winners
The Grand finale event was held in Chennai at EVP Film City and telecast live on 26 May at 19:30 (IST). The grand finale of the show Hosted by Deepak Dinkar and Archana Chandoke.

Top five finalists

Contestants
A total of twelve celebrities, mostly TV actors, are paired with dancers handpicked through auditions and will go head to head in their quest to be best performers.

Auditions
The auditions about the show has begun in Coimbatore on 23 September, followed by auditions in Madurai and Trichy.Chennai's audition is all set to take place tomorrow and all the shortlisted participants from all these places will participate in the mega audition that will be held on 29 October.
 Coimbatore
 Madurai
 Trichy
 Chennai

Awards and nominations

References

External links 
 Dance Jodi Dance (season 2) on ZEE5
 

Zee Tamil original programming
2017 Tamil-language television series debuts
2017 Tamil-language television seasons
Tamil-language dance television shows
Tamil-language reality television series
2018 Tamil-language television series endings
Tamil-language television shows
Television shows set in Tamil Nadu